New York Financial Press (NYFP) is a media company founded by Pierre Alexandre and based on Wall Street.

Overview 
New York Financial Press was founded in August 2005 by Pierre Alexandre, a former Wall Street correspondent for LCI. NYFP offers financial videos in 8 different languages (English, French, Arabic, Spanish, Portuguese, Chinese, Japanese and Russian), producing around 50 videos a day in high quality broadcast.
NYFP works with the New York Stock Exchange and possesses its own studios.

NYFP's editorial staff is composed of international reporters helped by steady assistants.

Services 
NYFP produces videos per day on business news  for an international audience., including live spots from Wall Street studios, analysis of the other markets and financial centers (Asia and Europe), as well as ad hoc reports on request for French  and other European media outlets.

NYFP's videos in broadcast quality are about 1'30 to 2'30 length. Videos can be seen on several broadcast channels such as France 24, on various websites and on mobile media (iPhone, mobile phones).

NYFP has closed agreements to broadcast its videos on websites such as capital.fr, lefigaro.fr, lexpansion.fr,businesscenter.tv, tradingsat.com or agefi.ch.
With Brightcove, the company is able to distribute and syndicate its programs, for example through those platforms: Blinkx, OneCast, Clipsyndicate, CanoeTV, Reuters...

New York Financial Press is specialized in macroeconomics and financial analysis but is also able to provide reports on demand in various fields: education (pedagogical videos), culture (covering special events) or new technologies.

NYFP made its name for itself through its technical provider activities and its experience in online videos.

Chronology 

August 2005: New York Financial Press is founded by Pierre Alexandre on Wall Street.

Novembre 2006: agreement between NYFP and France 24 to provide daily videos and live spot.

September 2007: NYFP supply Orange (Group France Telecom). Launching of the video stream online in French for 120 associate websites.

November 2007: beginning the TV production (provider of CNBC Italy, AFP, RFO, TF1...)

February 2008: Tradingcentral got in NYFP's capital investment.

March 2009: New York French Press became New York Financial Press. Launching the video stream in English on the main platforms (Blinkx, OneCast, Clipsyndicate, CanoeTV, Reuters...)

July 2009: NYFP provides videos for BNP Paribas's website, bnpparibas.net.

October 2009: NYFP launches new generation of websites dedicated for mobile terminals: m.bourse24.mobi and m.businesscenter.tv

December 2009: NYFP is 5 days a week on Europe 1, a French national radio station, for a report at the market close. This report is available on europe1.fr

References

External links 
 
 http://www.businesscenter.tv
 http://www.netvibes/nyfp
 https://www.nyse.com/events/1282212712296.html

Film distributors of the United States